HD 177830 is a 7th magnitude binary star system located approximately 205 light-years away in the constellation of Lyra. The primary star is slightly more massive than the Sun, but cooler being a type K star. Therefore, it is a subgiant clearly more evolved than the Sun. In visual light it is four times brighter than the Sun, but because of its distance, about 205 light years, it is not visible to the unaided eye. With binoculars it should be easily visible.

The primary star is known to have two extrasolar planets orbiting around it.

Stellar system
The secondary star is a Red dwarf star orbiting at a distance of 100 to 200 AU with a likely period of roughly 800 years.

Planetary system
On November 1, 1999, the discovery of a planet HD 177830 b was announced by the California and Carnegie Planet Search team using the very successful radial velocity method and an analysis on data released by the team performed by amateur astronomer Peter Jalowiczor along with two other planets. This planet is nearly 50% more massive than Jupiter and takes 407 days to orbit the star in an extremely circular orbit. In 2000 a group of scientists proposed, based on preliminary Hipparcos astrometrical satellite data, that the orbital inclination of HD 177830 b is as little as 1.3°. However, it is very unlikely that the planet would have such orbit. Furthermore, brown dwarfs with short orbits around solar-mass stars are exceedingly rare (the so-called "brown dwarf desert") making the claim even more unlikely.

On November 17, 2010, the discovery of a second planet HD 177830 c was announced along with four other planets. The planet has 50% the mass of Saturn and takes 111 days to orbit the star in a very eccentric orbit. This planet is in  a near 4:1 resonance with the outer planet.

See also
 List of extrasolar planets

References

177830
093746
Lyra (constellation)
K-type subgiants
Planetary systems with two confirmed planets
Durchmusterung objects
Binary stars